Manseer Group is a holding company established in the year 1999 in Jordan by Ziyad Manasir who is currently its chairman. The Company operates mainly in Jordan and has activity in West Bank as well and manages 16 subsidiary companies related to infrastructure, energy, business solutions, consumer products and services, and chemicals.

History 
The beginning in year 1999, Manaseer, was with a chemical and fertilizer distribution company with a total head count of 15 employees. Since then the group has grown to include more than 19 companies related to Infrastructure, Energy, Business solutions, Consumer products & services, Chemicals, and doing partnerships with three of the biggest companies in the kingdom.

Manaseer Iron and Steel (2001) 

The Company manufactures steel from the kingdom’s resources of scrap metal to
produce steel billets and reinforced steel.

Manaseer Ready Mix Concrete (2001)

Manaseer Crushers (2002)

Manaseer concrete products (2006) 
Manaseer concrete company was established
in 2006.

Manaseer Cement and Mining (2009) 
In order to complete the cycle of
construction services rendered to the customers, Manaseer group established
Manaseer Cement Industry in 2009.

The company has signed an agreement with
the European company FLS to supply production lines,
equipment and civil work design, as well as commissioning the plant with a
capacity of 3.5 million ton annually.

The production started in 2012.

Manaseer Oil & Gas (2002) 
Manaseer Oil & Gas is the first
company in Jordan to manage a chain of fuel stations.

Manaseer Import & Export (2012) 
The company is concerned with importing and
exporting oil and lubricants.

Manaseer Transport (2010)

Manaseer Vision (2010) 
The Company handles car parts and
accessories.

Manaseer Machinery Trading (2012) 
The company provides business solutions
through the representation of PACCAR (DAF, Kenworth & Peterbilt) for
trucks, Diesel Engines, Concord Concrete Pumps, Kawasaki & Kobelco Heavy
Machinery, GoodYear Tires and Petro Canada Oil & Lubricants in addition to
TRP spare parts.

Manaseer Invest (2007) 
The company’s main aim is to serve the
group in the Real Estate market, Property management and investing in other
companies by buying shares, importing and exporting, owning transferable and
non-transferable funds for the company’s continuity.

Manaseer Food (2003) 
Manaseer Food is concerned with the production of extra virgin olive oil under the
brand name “TERRA ROSSA”.

Manaseer High Technology (2004)

Lumi Market (2012) 
drinks, snacks, groceries and
hygiene products

Manaseer Trade (1999) 
The company was established in 1999 to Import
& export chemicals, fertilizers and trading of agricultural seeds.

Manaseer Chemicals (2002) 
The company’s aim is to pioneer the
production, and manufacture of fertilizers and chemicals using creative ideas and solutions. The
company has a French designed NPK Fertilizer factory that uses a special and fully
automatic mixing technology, a Urea Phosphate plant was then created using a
Swiss technology. Production capacity of both facilities exceeds 60K tons
annually.

Manaseer Foundation

References

External links

Oil and gas companies of Jordan
Energy companies established in 1999
Jordanian companies established in 1999
Holding companies established in 1999